KMPH may refer to:

 KMPH-TV, a television station (channel 28, virtual 26) licensed to serve Visalia, California, United States
 KMPH-CA, a defunct KMPH-TV translator station (channel 17) formerly licensed to serve Merced-Mariposa, California
 KMPH (AM), a radio station (840 AM) licensed to serve Modesto, California
 Kilometres per hour